César Roel Schreurs, best known as César Costa, is a Mexican actor and rock-and-roll singer.

Costa was born in Colonia Condesa of the Mexican capital. He studied elementary and Junior Highschool at the German College and Law at the Universidad Nacional Autónoma de México (UNAM).

Music career 
He started his musical career at the age of 17 as César Roel singing and playing guitar with the rock-and-roll band Los Black Jeans ("The Black Jeans"), singing Spanish versions of American hit singles as well as original songs like La batalla de Jericó. They recorded their first album in 1959 with Peerless Records. His backup singer was world-renowned tenor Plácido Domingo.

When the band signed with Musart Records the band changed its name to Los Camisas Negras ("The Black Shirts") and César Roel to Cesar Costa (honoring music arranger Don Costa). Soon after, the band disintegrated and César started a successful solo career, recording three albums with Orfeón Records. Then with RCA Mexicana he recorded romantic songs.

In 1983 he participated in the OTI Festival and obtained the second place with a song by  titled Tierno ("Tender").

Acting career
Supported by his success in the music industry, he joined other singers in films of the Cinema of Mexico such as 
Angélica María, Enrique Guzmán and Alberto Vázquez. In 1961 he made his first film Juventud Rebelde.

In 1986 he starred in the sitcom Papá soltero ("Single Dad"), a show that became a success in Latin America and then was adapted to the screen as Me tengo que casar ("I have to get married"). In the 1980s he hosted a comedy show "La Carabina De Ambrosio" and in the 1990s a talk show with model Rebecca de Alba called Un Nuevo Día and next year Al Fin de Semana.

In 1993 he presented a show together with Angélica María, Enrique Guzmán, Manolo Muñoz and Alberto Vásquez at the Auditorio Nacional with great success. He also had a radio show called De Costa a Costa ("From coast to coast") broadcast on Cadena ACIR. As of 2005 he has a TV show called Ensalada César ("Caesar salad") on Canal Once of the Instituto Politécnico Nacional.

Honors 
 Mexican ambassador to the UNICEF on August 17, 2004
 Mister Amigo 2001
 Inducted into the Paseo de las Luminarias at the Plaza de las Estrellas in Mexico City for his work in television and in the recording industry.

Albums 
 Un Vaso de Vino
 Chao! Amiga
 Corazón Loco
 Jornada Sentimental
 Tu Amor... y Mi Cariño
 Lo Nuevo...
 La Historia de Tommy
 Para Enamorados
 Sinceramente
 Canta
 César Costa y Los Camisas Negras (1960)

TV shows
 "Ensalada César" (2006)
 Al fin de semana (1998)
 Un nuevo día (1994–1997)
 Papá soltero (1987–1994) as César
 La carabina de Ambrosio (1978–1983)
 Alegrias (1968)

Films
 Me tengo que casar (Papá soltero, 1995)
 Bang bang... al hoyo (1971)
 Caín, Abel y el otro (1971)
 Al fin a solas (1969)
 Romance sobre ruedas (1969)
 El mundo loco de los jóvenes (1967)
 Arrullo de Dios (1967)
 Adios cuñado! (1967)
 Que haremos con papá? (1966)
 La juventud se impone (1964)
 La edad de la violencia (1964)
 Premier Orfeon (1964) TV Series
 Dile que la quiero (1963)
 El cielo y la tierra (1962)
 Si yo fuera millonario (1962)
 Juventud rebelde (1961)

External links
 
 Biography 
 Nombran a César Costa embajador de UNICEF  ("César Costa is named ambassador to the UNICEF"), article on esmas.com
 List of Mister Amigos

1941 births
Living people
Male actors from Mexico City
Singers from Mexico City
Mexican male film actors
Mexican radio presenters
20th-century Mexican male singers
Mexican people of German descent
National Autonomous University of Mexico alumni
Latin Grammy Lifetime Achievement Award winners
Latin music record producers